Tylopilus brevisporus is a bolete fungus found in Australia. It is similar in appearance to Tylopilus felleus, but is distinguishable from that species by its smaller spores.

References

External links

brevisporus
Fungi described in 1999
Fungi of Australia